Exaeretia nivalis is a moth in the family Depressariidae. It is found in North America, where it has been recorded from Montana, Wyoming, Washington, British Columbia and Alberta.

The wingspan is 21–23 mm. The forewings are white, with a faint light-brown shade slightly beyond the base, in the inner angle and along the inner margin. There are two discal spots at the basal third and another, larger white-centered discal spot at the end of the cell. There is a series of spots along the costa and around the termen, as well as sparse fuscous to blackish fuscous irrorations over the entire surface of the forewing. The hindwings are white.

References

Moths described in 1904
Exaeretia
Moths of North America